Events in the year 1903 in Ireland.

Events
 3 January – The Norwegian ship Remittant was towed into quarantine in Queenstown with the entire crew suffering from beriberi.
 3 February – The proposed canonisation of Oliver Plunkett was discussed in Rome.
 26 February – The ocean liner SS Columbus was launched by Harland and Wolff in Belfast.
 27 February – A meeting at the Mansion House, Dublin, enthusiastically welcomed a movement to establish Saint Patrick's Day as a national holiday.
 8 March – Charles Gavan Duffy was buried at Glasnevin Cemetery in Dublin. He was laid to rest near others who took part in the Young Irelander Rebellion of 1848.
 9 March – The Londonderry and Lough Swilly Railway's Letterkenny and Burtonport Extension was opened.
 17 March – In Waterford, Saint Patrick's Day was marked as a public holiday (to encourage temperance).
 26 March – The Chief Secretary for Ireland, George Wyndham, introduced his Irish Land Bill in the House of Commons of the United Kingdom.
 31 March – The Lord-Lieutenant announced that Edward VII and Queen Alexandra intended to visit Ireland within the coming year.
 15 May – The Chief Secretary for Ireland, George Wyndham, asked for support for his Irish Land Bill.
 23 May – Extracts from the annual report of the British Army showed that there were 35,717 Irishmen in its service.
 9 June – The University of Dublin announced that it was to award degrees to women following a vote. The first women would be admitted as full members of its sole constituent, Trinity College Dublin, in 1904.
 1 July – The Belfast and Northern Counties Railway became the Northern Counties Committee of the Midland Railway of England.
 19–27 July – King Edward VII made his first visit to Ireland as monarch, landing at Buncrana.
 14 August – The Land Purchase (Ireland) Act 1903 was passed in the House of Commons of the United Kingdom, offering special incentives to landlords to sell their entire estates.
 5 September – Irish painter Henry Jones Thaddeus was granted permission to paint the first portrait of Pope Pius X.
 13 November – The 2nd Battalion of The Royal Dublin Fusiliers was welcomed home after nearly 20 years of foreign service.
 Undated
 Independent Orange Institution was formed, as a breakaway from the Orange Institution.
 The Pigeon House generating station in Dublin started producing electricity.
 The withdrawal of the last British Royal Navy guard ship to be permanently stationed at Kingstown, the cruiser , took place.
 The Cork International Exhibition was re-opened.

Arts and literature
  January – An Túr Gloine, the cooperative studio for stained glass, was established by Sarah Purser in Dublin.
 8 October – J. M. Synge's play, In the Shadow of the Glen, was first performed at the Molesworth Hall, Dublin.
 7 December – The first Irish language opera, Muirgheis, with music by Thomas O'Brien Butler and libretto by Thadgh O'Donoghue was first performed at the Theatre Royal, Dublin.
 Padraic Colum's Broken Soil was performed by W. G. Fay's Irish National Dramatic Company.
 George Moore's short stories The Untilled Field were published.
 'Æ' (George William Russell)'s The Nuts of Knowledge, lyrical poems old and new was published by Elizabeth Yeats's Dun Emer Press at Dundrum, Dublin.
 W. B. Yeats's poetry collection In the Seven Woods, being poems of the Irish heroic age was published by his sister's Dun Emer Press; he also published his essays Ideas of Good and Evil.
 County Cork-born Chicago chief of police Francis O'Neill's collection O'Neill's Music of Ireland was published.

Sport

Association football
 International
 14 February – England 4–0 Ireland (in Wolverhampton)
 21 March – Scotland 0–2 Ireland (in Glasgow)
 28 March – Ireland 2–0 Wales (in Belfast)
 Irish League
 Winners: Distillery F.C.
 Irish Cup
 Winners: Distillery F.C. 3–1 Bohemian F.C.
 Bohemian F.C. became the first Dublin team to join the Irish Football League.
 The Oval football stadium, home of Glentoran F.C., was rebuilt, with the pitch being turned around ninety degrees.

Motor racing
 2 July – The Gordon Bennett Cup race was run on Irish public roads, the first international motor race in Ireland. The winner was Camille Jenatzy.

Births
 15 January – Joe Stynes, Irish Republican and sportsman (died 1991).
 19 January – Alfred Lane Beit, British politician, art collector and philanthropist, honorary Irish citizen (died 1994).
 28 January – Kathleen Lonsdale, X-ray crystallographer (died 1971).
 2 February – Hilton Edwards, actor, director, co–founder of Gate Theatre, born in London (died 1982).
 5 February – William Teeling, author, traveller and UK politician (died 1975).
 23 February – Alec Mackie, association football player (died 1984 in Northern Ireland).
 11 March – Michael Hilliard, Fianna Fáil party Teachta Dála (TD), Cabinet minister and Member of the European Parliament (died 1982).
 13 March – Joseph Blowick second leader of the Clann na Talmhan party, TD and Cabinet minister (died 1970).
 5 April – Leo Rowsome, teacher, player, and maker of uilleann pipes (died 1970).
 12 April – Paddy Collins, Cork hurler (died 1995).
 25 May – Ewart Milne, poet (died 1987).
 8 June – Harry Duggan, association football player (died 1968).
 17 July – Dinny Barry-Murphy, Cork hurler (died 1973).
 18 July – Charles Hill, cricketer (died 1982).
 5 August – Achey Kelly, cricketer (died 1961).
 17 September – Frank O'Connor, short story writer and memoirist (died 1966).
 6 October – Ernest Walton, physicist, 1951 Nobel Prize for Physics (died 1995).
 23 October – Patrick Cogan, Independent TD (died 1977).
 1 November – Max Adrian, actor (died 1973).
 18 December – Harry Forsyth, cricketer (died 2004).
 Undated
 Leo Maguire, singer, songwriter and radio broadcaster (died 1985).
 Stanley Woods, motor cycle racer, with 29 Grand Prix wins and 10 Isle of Man TT wins (died 1993).

Deaths
 9 February – Charles Gavan Duffy, nationalist and Australian colonial politician (born 1816).
 5 April – Mary Anne Sadlier, novelist (born 1820).
 24 April – Walter Osborne, impressionist painter (born 1859).
 27 April – William Travers, lawyer, politician, explorer, and naturalist in New Zealand (born 1819).
 25 July – John Michael Clancy, Democratic Party United States Representative from New York (born 1837).
 31 August – Charles O'Hea, Catholic Priest, baptised Ned Kelly and ministered to him before he was hanged in 1880 (born c. 1814).
 12 September – Maxwell Henry Close, geologist (born 1822).
 22 October – William Edward Hartpole Lecky, historian (born 1838).
 24 October – James Adams (chaplain), recipient of the Victoria Cross for gallantry in Afghanistan (1879) (born 1839).

References

 
1900s in Ireland
Ireland
Years of the 20th century in Ireland
Ireland